Glam punk is a term used retrospectively to describe a short-lived trend for bands which produced a form of proto-punk that incorporated elements of glam rock, initially in the early to mid-1970s.

History 
Glam punk has been seen as a backlash to the hippie folk music sensibilities of the 1960s. Lucy O'Brien defines the New York Dolls style as combining "Rolling Stones raunch with heavy borrowings from the girl group era". The band was highly influential in New York City's club scene of the early 1970s, as well as with later generations of musicians, and their style was adopted by a number of New York bands, including Ruby and the Rednecks. The Dolls broke up in 1976, by which time the trend had already metamorphosed into punk and begun to move on to new wave.

Influence 
The New York Dolls helped spark the beginning of punk rock, with Malcolm McLaren informally managing them in 1975, before returning to England, where he and Vivienne Westwood used the New York Dolls, as well as other bands that they had seen while in New York, as inspiration for punk fashion and the creation of the Sex Pistols. They also influenced the glam metal scene that emerged in the 1980s, through the adoption of glam aesthetics by bands including Hanoi Rocks, Mötley Crüe and Guns N' Roses.

The term has been used to describe later bands who combined glam aesthetics with punk music, including early Manic Street Preachers. Glam punk was a major influence on bands of the New York post-punk revival that included D Generation, Toilet Böys, and The Strokes.

See also 
 Glam metal
 Glam rock
 List of glam punk artists

References 

 
Punk rock genres